The 2010 Zagreb Open was a professional tennis tournament played on outdoor red clay courts. It was part of the 2010 ATP Challenger Tour. It took place in Zagreb, Croatia between May 10 and May 16, 2010.

Entrants

Seeds

 Rankings are as of May 3, 2010.

Other entrants
The following players received wildcards into the singles main draw:
  Gastón Gaudio
  Nikola Mektić
  Bernard Tomic
  Antonio Veić

The following players received entry from the qualifying draw:
  Attila Balázs
  Ilya Belyaev
  Andrey Kuznetsov
  Antonio Sančić

The following player received special exempt into the main draw:
  Ivo Minář

Champions

Singles

 Yuri Schukin def.  Santiago Ventura, 6–3, 7–5

Doubles

 Andre Begemann /  Matthew Ebden def.  Rubén Ramírez Hidalgo /  Santiago Ventura, 7–6(5), 5–7, [10–3]

External links
Official website
ITF search

Zagreb Open
Zagreb Open
2010 in Croatian tennis